Florin Constantin Plămadă (born 30 April 1992) is a Romanian professional footballer who plays as a centre back for Politehnica Iași.

Club career

Politehnica Iași
After some impressive performances for Foresta Suceava in the beginning of the 2013–14 season, Politehnica Iași secured the loan of Plămadă for the rest of the campaign.

In June 2013, after Politehnica Iași secured the promotion from Liga II, Plămadă prolonged his loan for another year so he cold make his debut in the Liga I.

Personal life
Florin's older brother Ionuț is also a footballer who spent most of his career in the Romanian second division Liga II, they played together at Rapid CFR Suceava.

References

External links

1992 births
Living people
People from Rădăuți
Romanian footballers
Romania under-21 international footballers
Association football defenders
Liga I players
Liga II players
ACS Foresta Suceava players
FC Politehnica Iași (2010) players
FC Botoșani players
FC Petrolul Ploiești players
FC Metaloglobus București players